Virginia "Ginny" Humphreys-Davies (born 6 January 1972) is a British former professional tennis player.

A right-handed player, Humphreys-Davies twice featured in the main draw of the Wimbledon Championships. She reached her career high singles ranking of 92 in the world in 1992. As a doubles player she had a best ranking of 239 and won four ITF titles.

ITF finals

Singles: 2 (0–2)

Doubles: 7 (4–3)

References

External links
 
 

1972 births
Living people
British female tennis players
English female tennis players